Rattlesnake Hill may refer to:

Rattlesnake Hill (Churchill County, Nevada)
Rattlesnake Hill (Delaware County, New York)
Rattlesnake Hill, California

See also
Rattlesnake Hills